My Sibling's Lovers: Family Is Watching is a South Korean TV Show distributed by E Channel. It airs every Sunday night at 9:00 KST.

Format 
A spin-off of My Daughter's Men.

My Sibling's Lover is follow a similar principle with the celebrities watching the dates of their siblings as they try to find love.

Host 

 Lee Soo-geun
 Kim Hee-chul
 Hwang Bo-ra
 Jang Yoon-hee
 Cho Kyu-hyun (Special Host - Ep. 6)

Cast 

 Lee Mal-nyeon
 Park Sung-kwang
 Jung Tae-woo
 Kisum

References

2019 South Korean television series debuts
Korean-language television shows
South Korean variety television shows